La Promenade may refer to:

 La Promenade (Renoir), an 1870 Impressionist painting by Pierre-Auguste Renoir
 Mother and Children, an 1876 Impressionist painting by Pierre-Auguste Renoir originally exhibited as La Promenade
 La Promenade (shopping mall), an American underground shopping mall
 La Promenade Building, a Canadian office building